Skamania Lodge is a resort near Stevenson, Washington, in the Columbia River Gorge, United States. Its lobby houses the Skamania Lodge Information Center, which serves as a visitor center for the United States Forest Service.

The resort underwent renovations in 2016, and opened luxury tree houses in 2017. Skamania also has an adventure park with zip-lining.

References

External links
 

Buildings and structures in Skamania County, Washington
Columbia River Gorge
Hotels in Washington (state)